Jenna Rae Eilee Westaway (born 19 June 1994) is a Canadian middle-distance runner. She competed in the 800 metres event at the 2014 IAAF World Indoor Championships and 2018 IAAF World Indoor Championships.

Competition record

References

1994 births
Living people
Canadian female middle-distance runners
Place of birth missing (living people)
Competitors at the 2017 Summer Universiade
Competitors at the 2019 Summer Universiade